Careful What You Wish For is the sixth album by Scottish rock band Texas, released 20 October 2003. The album went on to achieve gold status in the UK for 100,000 copies sold.

Release and reception

Only two singles were produced from Careful What You Wish For. The first was the hit UK Top 10 single, "Carnival Girl" which reached #9 on the UK Singles Charts and was also a hit in other European countries.

A second single, "I'll See It Through" was released in December 2003. However, the single was less successful than the release of "Carnival Girl", only debuting at #40 on the UK Singles Charts. After this their record label, Mercury Records, decided not to release a third single from the album, and this led Texas to re-enter the studio to start work on their next album, Red Book (2005).

Track listing

Personnel
Texas
Sharleen Spiteri –  vocals, guitar, piano, keyboards
Ally McErlaine –  guitar
Johnny McElhone –  guitar, bass, piano, keyboards
Tony McGovern –  guitar, vocals
Eddie Campbell –  piano, keyboards
Neil Payne –  drums (track 3)

Production
Tim Young – mastering
Johnny Mac – producer

Chart positions

Weekly charts

Year-end charts

Certifications and sales

References

Texas (band) albums
2003 albums
Albums produced by Ian Broudie
Albums produced by Trevor Horn
Mercury Records albums